Richard Clerk may refer to:

Richard Clerk (bishop), bishop in England and Ireland
Richard Clerk (MP), English Member of Parliament

See also
Richard le Clerk, Gloucester MP
Richard Clerke (disambiguation)
Richard Clarke (disambiguation)
Richard Clark (disambiguation)